Rhynchoferella hoppei is a moth in the family Copromorphidae. It is found on Bioko and in Kenya.

References

Copromorphidae